IANS may refer to:

 Indo-Asian News Service, Indian news agency
Institute of Air Navigation Services (IANS), a division of European Organisation for the Safety of Air Navigation

See also
Ian (disambiguation)